Chester M. Alter (1906–2006) served as the twelfth Chancellor at the University of Denver (DU) from 1953 to 1967. He was a scientist and an educator. He worked on the Manhattan Project during World War II.

Background

Chester M. Alter was born in rural Indiana on March 21, 1906. He earned his bachelor's degree from Ball State Teachers College in 1927 and  his master's degree in 1928 from Indiana University Bloomington. He also completed some graduate work at the University of Pittsburgh during the 1928-1929 academic year. He married Arvilla Morrison in 1933 and had a son, Richard David Alter, six years later. In 1936, Alter earned his Ph.D. in chemistry from Harvard University.
Alter began his career as a teacher in the Indiana Public Schools. He later taught at Harvard and Boston University. He worked at Boston University as an instructor in chemistry from 1934–1953, becoming dean of the graduate school in 1944. Alter was recruited by the U. S. War Department to work on the Manhattan Project during World War II.  This project resulted in the development of the atomic bomb. For his contributions he was awarded a Bronze Medal and a Certificate of Merit. He also served as a consultant for the Research and Development Board of the U.S. Department of Defense. In 1953, Alter was offered the position of chancellor at the University of Denver.

Career

Alter was the twelfth chancellor of the University of Denver serving from 1953 to 1967. During his term of office, he initiated the construction of the Boettcher Science Center (1963), Cherrington Hall (1965), the Mass Communications Building, (1961) the Business Administration Building (1968), the Law Center (1965) Johnson-McFarlane Residence Hall (1960), Centennial Residence Hall (1961) and Centennial Residence Towers (1963). The DU campus grew from 75 acres to 125 acres during his tenure. Alter increased faculty salaries and was instrumental in attracting outstanding scholars such as Arnold Toynbee (visiting professor) and Averell Harriman (speaker) to the University.  In 1961 Alter ended the University of Denver Football Program. His  administration determined that expenditures on football programs were taking funding away from other more important programs. Alter wanted to see more funding for academic projects and intramural sports, which he thought would be of greater benefit to the entire University community. In 1964, during the DU centennial celebration, Alter was honored with the Evans Award from the Alumni Association of the University.
After leaving the University of Denver in 1967, Alter served as a trustee in organizations such as the Gates Foundation, the Central City Opera Association, the Young Men's Christian Association (YMCA) and the George W. Clayton Trust.  He was the first non-lawyer to be an officer of the American Judicature Society. In 1980 he was honored with the Justice Award for his service. The Justice Award is given for major contributions to improving the administration of justice. Alter also served in various scientific and professional organizations such as the American Chemical Society, the American Association for the Advancement of Science and the American Association of University Professors.

The Chester M. Alter Arboretum at the University of Denver was named on April 30, 1999, to recognize his work and influence as the twelfth chancellor of the university and also for his well-known love for trees. David Christophel, the director of the arboretum, and arborist Marc Hathaway designed the arboretum to beautify the DU campus with trees. Alter died in Santa Fe, New Mexico, in 2006 at the age of 99.

Carol Farnsworth, ed., "Built for Learning: A Unified Architectural Vision for the University of Denver," (Denver: University of Denver, 2008), 202.
Chester M. Alter, "Curriculum Vitae," (Special Collections, University of Denver Penrose Library, June 17, 1964) 1.
Chester M. Alter, “New Goals, New Tasks,” (paper presented at the Opening Convocation of University of Denver Centennial Period, University of Denver, Denver, September 28, 1960).
“College Presidents Discuss Future Programs and Goals,” The Newsletter of the Association of Urban Universities, July 1966, 1,8.
“DU’s ‘First Lady’ Dies at 90,” Denver Post, January 1, 1998.
Marjorie Barrett, “Retired Educator Keeps On,”  Rocky Mountain News, June 25, 1982, 57-58-W.
Paula Davidson, “Chester Alter Has Dedicated His Life to Education, Achievement,” Clarion (University of Denver), February 15, 1996, 7.

1906 births
2006 deaths
Chancellors of the University of Denver
Harvard Graduate School of Arts and Sciences alumni
Indiana University Bloomington alumni
Ball State University alumni
Boston University faculty
20th-century American academics